Karjanha  is a Municipality in Siraha District in the Madhesh Province of East of Nepal. At the time of the 1991 Nepal census it had a population of 5296 people living in 954 individual households. Also birth place for two most famous people from this Municipality Chef Santosh shah and Upendra mahato

References

External links
UN map of the municipalities of  Siraha District

Populated places in Siraha District
Nepal municipalities established in 2017
Municipalities in Madhesh Province